The women's 200 metres event at the 1987 Pan American Games was held in Indianapolis, United States on 12, 13 and 15 August.

Medalists

Results

Heats

Wind:Heat 1: -1.2 m/s, Heat 2: -1.2 m/s, Heat 3: -0.1 m/s

Semifinals

Wind:Heat 1: +1.4 m/s, Heat 2: -0.9 m/s

Final
Wind: +2.2 m/s

References

Athletics at the 1987 Pan American Games
1987
Pan